This article will display the squads for the 2011 African Youth Championship. Only players born on or after 1 January 1991 are eligible to play.

Each participating national association must submit a list of up to 40 players to the CAF administration on or before 16 February 2011 (sixty days before the first game of the final tournament). 
 
Only 21 of the 40 players listed are authorised to take part in the final tournament. The final squad of 21 players must be submitted on or before 7 April 2011 (ten days before the first game of the final tournament).

Head coach:  Diaa Al-Sayed

Head coach:

Head coach:  Lamin Sarr

Head coach:  Orlando Wellington

Head coach:  Khiba Mohoanyane

Head coach:  Cheick Fantamady Diallo

Head coach:  John Obuh

Notes
Note 1: Markson Ojobo and Gomo Onduko were dropped just hours prior to Nigeria's opening match for "technical reasons". Reports suggested that both players were found to be over-aged.

Head coach:  Maqsood Chenia

References

Squads
Africa U-20 Cup of Nations squads